The Beit Shemesh Judean Rebels (up until 2019-Judean Rebels) are an amateur American football team in the Israel Football League. The Rebels represent the city of Beit Shemesh and Gush Etzion settlements and they play their home games at the Beit Shemesh Stadium.

History 
The Rebels joined the Israel Football League (IFL) as an expansion team in 2009. While the Rebels are a settler team, they have also included Palestinian players. 

In their second season, they won IsraBowl IV over the Tel Aviv Sabres. The Rebels have also won IsraBowl VIII and IsraBowl IX. 

In 2019, the organization moved from Jerusalem to Beit Shemesh along with their high school team the Beit Shemesh Warriors.

References 

American football teams in Israel
Sport in Jerusalem
American football teams established in 2009
2009 establishments in Israel